Jana Klusáčková (née Myšková) (born 29 October 1977) is a Czech former swimmer, who specialized in sprint freestyle events. She is a two-time Olympian and a multiple-time Czech champion and record holder for the freestyle events (50, 100, and 200 m). Klusackova also won a bronze medal in the 100 m freestyle at the 2005 Summer Universiade in Izmir, Turkey, in an outstanding time of 56.40 seconds.

Klusackova made her first Czech team, as a 26-year-old, at the 2004 Summer Olympics in Athens, competing in both the individual and relay freestyle events. She also participated in the women's 4 × 100 m freestyle relay, along with fellow swimmers Sandra Kazíková, Petra Klosová, and Ilona Hlaváčková. Swimming the lead-off leg, Klusackova recorded a split of 56.02 seconds, and the Czech team continued to finish heat one in seventh place, and thirteenth overall, for a total time of 3:46.83. On the third day of the competition, Klusackova won the second heat of the 200 m freestyle by two hundredths of a second (0.02) ahead of Macedonia's Vesna Stojanovska, with a time of 2:04.62. In the 100 m freestyle, Klusackova edged out Xu Yanwei of China by seven hundredths of a second (0.07) on the seventh heat, with a time of 56.59 seconds.

At the 2008 Summer Olympics in Beijing, Klusackova qualified for the second time in the women's 100 m freestyle, by breaking a new Czech record and clearing a FINA B-cut of 55.41 from the national championships in Prague. She challenged seven other swimmers in the fifth heat, including top favorites Cate Campbell of Australia, Francesca Halsall of Great Britain, and Aliaksandra Herasimenia of Belarus. She came only in last place by 0.69 of a second behind Netherlands' Inge Dekker, lowering her time to 55.92 seconds. Klusackova, however, failed to advance into the semifinals, as she placed thirty-first out of 69 swimmers in the evening preliminaries.

References

External links
NBC Olympics Profile

1977 births
Living people
Czech female swimmers
Olympic swimmers of the Czech Republic
Swimmers at the 2004 Summer Olympics
Swimmers at the 2008 Summer Olympics
Universiade medalists in swimming
Czech female freestyle swimmers
Sportspeople from Pardubice
Universiade bronze medalists for the Czech Republic